Extreme Evidence is an American reality television series that premiered on Court TV on September 29, 2003. Each half-hour episode attempts to use forensic science to uncover the cause of a catastrophic event. 3-D animation, and first-hand accounts from eyewitnesses, are also used to illuminate the investigations. As of late January 2015, the show is now in reruns on the Justice Network.

Production
Court TV used several production companies to produce episodes of Extreme Evidence, including LMNO Cable Group, Medstar Television, and New York Times Television.

Episodes

References

2000s American reality television series
2003 American television series debuts
2005 American television series endings